Dagon Stars United Football Club is a Burmese football club based in Dagon Township, Yangon and founded in 2009. Dagon FC plays in MNL-2 since 2009. In 2015 MNL-2 season, they did not promote to Myanmar National League. In 2022 , Dagon FC name changed to Dagon Stars United Football Club.

2023 Final Squad

References

External links
 First Eleven Journal in Burmese
 Soccer Myanmar in Burmese

Football clubs in Myanmar
Association football clubs established in 2009
Myanmar National League clubs
2009 establishments in Myanmar